Melzer See may refer to:

Melzer See (Waren), Germany
Melzer See (Melz), Germany